The Northern Journal is a weekly newspaper based out of Fort Smith, Northwest Territories, Canada. As of 2013, the Northern Journal provides coverage of events in the Northwest Territories, alongside NWT News/North. It also covers the Municipality of Wood Buffalo in northeastern Alberta, including Fort Chipewyan, Fort McMurray and the oilsands industry. Up until January 2011, the Northern Journal was operated as the Slave River Journal, until owner Don Jaque made the decision to extend the scope of his publication to include the entirety of the Northwest Territories. The Northern Journal had a stated circulation of 4,000, as of June 2013. In addition to resident journalists, Northern Journal draws from a number of freelance writers and photographers across the NWT including regular contributors in Yellowknife.

References 

Newspapers published in the Northwest Territories
Weekly newspapers published in Canada
Publications established in 1977